This is a list of films which have placed number one at the weekend box office in Belgium and Luxembourg during 2009.

See also
List of Belgian films

Notes
All the films are North American or British productions, except as noted.

References
 Note: Click on the relevant weekend to view specifics.

2009
Belgium
2009 in Belgium